Grace Lalrampari Hauhnar (born 20 February 2001) is an Indian footballer who plays as a midfielder for Odisha FC and the India women's national team.

Club career
Hauhnar plays for Gokulam Kerala in India. She was part of the Mizoram state team which reached the semi-finals of the Senior Women's National Football Championship for the first time in the 2021–22 edition.

International career
Hauhnar represented the India U20 team at the 2019 AFC U-19 Women's Championship qualification and scored against Thailand. She was called up for the national team for the friendly matches against Vietnam and the 2019 South Asian Games in 2019.

Honours

Gokulam Kerala
Indian Women's League: 2019–20

References

External links 
 Grace Lalrampari Hauhnar at All India Football Federation
 

2001 births
Living people
People from Aizawl
Sportswomen from Mizoram
Footballers from Mizoram
Indian women's footballers
India women's youth international footballers
Women's association football fullbacks
India women's international footballers
Gokulam Kerala FC Women players
Sethu FC players
Odisha FC Women players
Indian Women's League players